The first South African military medal was a campaign medal, the South Africa Medal, instituted in 1854 by Queen Victoria, the sovereign of the United Kingdom of Great Britain and Ireland, for award to officers and men of the Royal Navy and British Army who served on the Eastern Frontier of the Cape Colony between 1834 and 1853 during the Xhosa Wars.

Five more South African campaign medals were instituted during the Colonial era until 1910, when the Union of South Africa was established as a dominion of the British Empire. After Union and until 1952, members of the Union Defence Forces (UDF) could be awarded decorations and medals of the British Empire and, from 1949, the British Commonwealth. A number of purely South African decorations and medals were also instituted during this period, such as belated awards for Boer forces who fought in the Second Boer War, a Union commemorative medal and South African versions of some Empire medals with bilingual inscriptions in English and Dutch or Afrikaans.

The first purely South African military orders, decorations and medals were instituted in 1952 by Elizabeth II, the Queen of the United Kingdom and the Commonwealth realms. From 1961 decorations and medals were instituted by the South African State President and, between 1976 and 1994, also by the Presidents of the TBVC States, Transkei, Bophuthatswana, Venda and Ciskei. These awards were instituted in seven groups for the seven separate military and para-military forces which were integrated into the South African National Defence Force in 1994.

The South African military
The Union of South Africa was established on 31 May 1910 in terms of the South Africa Act, 1909, enacted by the Parliament of the United Kingdom. In terms of Section 17 of the Act the command-in-chief of the naval and military forces within the Union was vested in the British monarch or in the Governor-General of the Union of South Africa as his representative.

The Union Defence Forces were established in 1912 in terms of the Union Defence Act, no. 13 of 1912, enacted by the Parliament of the Union of South Africa. The UDF were renamed the South African Defence Force (SADF) in 1958. On 27 April 1994 the SADF was integrated with six other independent South African military and para-military forces into the South African National Defence Force (SANDF).

The seven constituent forces of the SANDF were:
 The South African Defence Force (SADF).
 The Transkei Defence Force (TDF).
 The Bophuthatswana Defence Force (BDF).
 The Venda Defence Force (VDF).
 The Ciskei Defence Force (CDF).
 Umkhonto we Sizwe (MK), the military wing of the African National Congress (ANC).
 The Azanian People's Liberation Army (APLA), the military wing of the Pan Africanist Congress (PAC).

Orders, decorations and medals

Until 31 May 1961 the Fount of Honour was the British monarch. In 1961 the State President of South Africa became the Fount of Honour. In the TBVC states, established between 1976 and 1981, the Founts of Honour were the respective State Presidents. On 27 April 1994 the President of South Africa became the Fount of Honour for all military orders, decorations and medals.

The Colonial and Dominion era
Until 1961, at first during the Colonial era and then from 1910 when the Union of South Africa was established, all military decorations and medals which were awarded to members of the Colonial Forces, the UDF and SADF were instituted by the British monarch.

The 1952–1975 group
The first purely South African military decorations and medals were instituted by the monarch of the United Kingdom and the Commonwealth realms on 6 April 1952 and, from 31 May 1961, by the State President. In 1952 a series of military decorations and medals was instituted by Queen Elizabeth II, consisting of substitutes for many of the British and Commonwealth awards which had been used until then. There were initially ten awards, to which a further eight as well as an emblem for being mentioned in dispatches were added between 1953 and 1970. All displayed the national Coat of Arms on the reverse, with the exception of the Union Medal and the Permanent Force Good Service Medal which had it on the obverse. Those awarded before South Africa became a republic in 1961 had Queen Elizabeth II's royal cipher above the Coat of Arms on the reverse.

The 1975–2003 group
During the limited representation Republican era, in July 1975, the military decorations and medals of the Republic were revised. Seven decorations and medals were carried over from the earlier series of 1952-1975 and, along with the Order of the Star of South Africa with decorations in two military and five non-military classes, thirteen new awards were instituted. They were followed by another eleven new decorations and medals between 1987 and 1991. With the exception of the Pro Virtute Decoration, the trio of Good Service Medals and the National Cadet Bisley Grand Champion Medal, all displayed the national Coat of Arms on the reverse.

The TBVC group
Between 1976 and 1981 the four independent republics of Transkei, Bophuthatswana, Venda and Ciskei, known collectively as the TBVC states, were established within South Africa. Each of them instituted a set of military decorations and medals for award to members of their respective defence forces.

The MK and APLA group
On 27 April 1994 South Africa became a fully representative republic. In 1996 a set of decorations and medals were instituted for award to members and veterans of MK and APLA.

The 2003 group
Finally, all but one of these earlier awards were discontinued in respect of services performed on or after 27 April 2003, when a new set of nine decorations and medals was instituted to replace them.

Order of wear

Until 5 April 1952 all South African, other Commonwealth and foreign orders, decorations and medals awarded to South Africans were worn in the order of wear as prescribed by the British Central Chancery of the Orders of Knighthood.

With effect from 6 April 1952 the aforementioned awards continued to be worn in the order of wear as prescribed on 5 April 1952 but, with one exception, took precedence after all South African orders, decorations and medals awarded to South Africans on or after that date. The exception was the Victoria Cross which, if awarded to a South African before 6 April 1952, still took precedence before all other awards.

Sorting keys
The table below lists all the South African military orders, decorations and medals in the official order of wear. All the table columns are sortable and the two columns for order of wear, "OoW 2003" and "OoW 1993", will sort the awards in either the combined order of wear which became effective on 27 April 2003, or in the individual orders of wear of the seven constituent forces which were integrated into the SANDF on 27 April 1994.

Most decorations for gallantry, distinguished and meritorious service and exceptional devotion to duty entitle the recipients to use the post-nominal letters as shown in the "PN" column of the table. These are succeeded, in order, by campaign medals in order of date of campaign, commemoration medals in order of date of institution, decorations and medals for efficiency, long service and good conduct, medals for skill at arms and proficiency in musketry, pre-1952 British era decorations and medals, and awards for voluntary and unremunerated service.

Notes
 ♠ In respect of recipients of the Emblem for Reserve Force Service only, indicating "Reserve Distinction".
  Use of the post-nominal MSM was restricted to awards for acts of gallantry during the First World War.
 ♣ Use of the post-nominal AE was restricted to officers only.

Errors and exclusions
The official order of wear of 2005 contains the caveat that, in the absence of full information on some awards, there may be among the awards listed for the TBVC states some which were never awarded. The official list contains minor errors, one of these being the post-nominal letters "VRD" instead of "DVR" for the Van Riebeeck Decoration. The post-nominal letters "VRD" are used for the Royal Naval Volunteer Reserve Decoration.

The following decorations and medals are excluded from the table:
 Civil, police, prisons and other non-military decorations and medals.
 Military decorations which, while officially instituted, were never awarded and now never will be. These include:
  The Castle of Good Hope Decoration (CGH) (South Africa).
  The Honoris Crux Diamond (HCD) (South Africa).
  The Pro Virtute Medal (PVM) (South Africa).
  The Cross for Valour (CCV) (Ciskei).
  The Cross for Gallantry (CCG) (Ciskei).
  The Cross for Bravery (CCB) (Ciskei).
  The Pro Merito Decoration (PMD) (Ciskei).

References

0
Orders of precedence